The following highways are numbered 323:

Canada
 Quebec Route 323

China
 China National Highway 323

Costa Rica
 National Route 323

Japan
 Japan National Route 323

United States
  County Road 323 (Levy County, Florida)
  Georgia State Route 323
  Kentucky Route 323
  Louisiana Highway 323
  Minnesota State Highway 323
  Montana Secondary Highway 323
  New York State Route 323 (former)
  Ohio State Route 323
  Puerto Rico Highway 323
  Tennessee State Route 323
 Texas:
  Texas State Highway 323
  Texas State Highway Loop 323
  Farm to Market Road 323
  Virginia State Route 323